Nqwebasaurus (anglicized as  or ) is a basal coelurosaur and is the basal-most member of the coelurosaurian clade Ornithomimosauria from the Early Cretaceous of South Africa. The name Nqwebasaurus is derived from the Xhosa word "Nqweba" which is the local name for the Kirkwood district, and "thwazi" is ancient Xhosa for "fast runner". Currently it is the oldest coelurosaur in Africa and shows that basal coelurosaurian dinosaurs inhabited Gondwana 50 million years earlier than previously thought. The type specimen of Nqwebasaurus was discovered by William J. de Klerk who is affiliated with the Albany Museum in Grahamstown. It is the only fossil of its species found to date and was found in the Kirkwood Formation of the Uitenhage Group. Nqwebasaurus has the unofficial nickname "Kirky", due to being found in the Kirkwood.

History of discovery 
Nqwebasaurus was first discovered by William J. de Klerk and Callum Ross in July 1996 during a joint expedition led by the Albany Museum in Grahamstown and Stony Brook in New York, United States, where Callum Ross was affiliated at the time. The fossil is remarkably complete and is considered an extremely rare find as no coelurosaur fossils had previously been found in Africa at this time. No new Nqwebasaurus fossils have been discovered since.

Description 

Nqwebasaurus is considered to have been a small to medium-sized ornithomimosaur. The type specimen is approximately 30 cm (1 ft) high and is estimated to have been 90 cm (3 ft) long, although its complete length is not known due to the caudal vertebrae of the type specimen being incomplete. In addition the type specimen is thought to be a late juvenile, although with the type specimen being the only fossil representing its species it is currently not possible to compare the fossil with another member of its species.

Nqwebasaurus has a long, three-fingered hand which includes a partially opposable thumb with a recurved claw. The claws on its hands differ in shape where the claws of the first and second digits are recurved and the third claw is not. This trait is unusual in theropod dinosaurs, however, it has been observed in some ornithomimosaurs such as Struthiomimus. Nqwebasaurus also lacks serrations on its maxillary teeth, has a reduced dentition, and contains gastroliths in its abdominal cavity. Again this is unusual trait for carnivorous theropod dinosaurs as gastroliths are more commonly found in herbivorous vertebrates and modern ostriches. Due to these morphological traits, Nqwebasaurus is thought to have been a herbivore.

As more basal theropod species, especially those on the evolutionary line to birds, had feathers it is accepted that Nqwebasaurus was likely at least partially feathered or had a feather coat for thermoregulation.

Classification 
More recent phylogenetic analyses that include Nqwebasaurus support its current position as the basalmost member of Ornithomimosauria, one of the most basal clades of Coelurosauria, and the sister taxon of Maniraptora. However, new fossil material of coelurosaurs from the Early Cretaceous of Gondwana is much needed in order to gain a further understanding of Gondwanan coelurosaur phylogeny.

The cladogram below follows an analysis by Yuong-Nam Lee, Rinchen Barsbold, Philip J. Currie, Yoshitsugu Kobayashi, Hang-Jae Lee, Pascal Godefroit, François Escuillié & Tsogtbaatar Chinzorig. The analysis was published in 2014, and displays the current phylogenetic position of Nqwebasaurus.

See also 
 Timeline of ornithomimosaur research

References 

Ornithomimosaurs
Early Cretaceous dinosaurs of Africa
Cretaceous South Africa
Fossils of South Africa
Fossil taxa described in 2000
Taxa named by Catherine Forster
Taxa named by Scott D. Sampson
Xhosa language